The William Salomon House was a mansion located on 1020 Fifth Avenue in Manhattan, New York City.

It was constructed for William Salomon, Sr.

Further reading

External links 
 http://daytoninmanhattan.blogspot.com/2012/01/lost-1906-william-salomon-mansion-1020.html

Houses in Manhattan
Fifth Avenue
Demolished buildings and structures in Manhattan
Upper East Side